The 1993 Canadian Open was a tennis tournament played on outdoor hard courts. It was the 104th edition of the Canada Masters, and was part of the ATP Super 9 of the 1993 ATP Tour, and of the Tier I Series of the 1993 WTA Tour. The men's event took place at the Uniprix Stadium in Montreal, Quebec, Canada, from July 26 through August 1, 1993, and the women's event at the National Tennis Centre in Toronto, Ontario, Canada, from August 16 through August 22, 1993.

Finals

Men's singles

 Mikael Pernfors defeated  Todd Martin, 2–6, 6–2, 7–5
It was Mikael Pernfor's 1st title of the year and his 3rd overall. It was his only Masters title.

Women's singles

 Steffi Graf defeated  Jennifer Capriati, 6–1, 0–6, 6–3
It was Steffi Graf's 7th title of the year and her 76th overall. It was her 3rd Tier I title of the year and her 8th overall. It was her 2nd title at the event, also winning in 1990.

Men's doubles

 Jim Courier /  Mark Knowles defeated  Glenn Michibata /  David Pate, 6–4, 7–6

Women's doubles

 Larisa Neiland /  Jana Novotná defeated  Arantxa Sanchez-Vicario /  Helena Suková 6–1, 6–2

References

External links
 
 Association of Tennis Professionals (ATP) tournament profile
 Women's Tennis Association (WTA) tournament profile

Canadian Open
Canadian Open
Canadian Open (tennis)
Canadian Open tennis
1990s in Montreal
1993 in Quebec
July 1993 sports events in Canada
August 1993 sports events in Canada
1993 in Canadian tennis